Félix de Chazournes (26 December 1887 – December 1940) was a French writer, the winner of the 1938 Prix Femina.

Biography 
Born in Lyon, de Chazournes was the eldest of twelve children of the couple Félix Marie Henri Boisson of Chazournes and Jeanne Troubat married in 1887 in Lyon.

de Chazournes first worked in a business house in England. While he was sent to Morocco, the First World War began and he was mobilized on site in the spahis. Sent to the front, he was incorporated among the chasseurs alpins (alpine hunters).

In 1918, he resumed his import-export work and moved to China, South America and the West Indies. In the 1930s, he wrote novels which were published by éditions Gallimard and obtained the Prix Femina in 1938 for Caroline ou le Départ pour les îles.

Works 
 1908: Les Boucles, édition Alphonse Lemerre.
 1935: Jason: Portrait des Tropiques (short story), Gallimard, .
 1938: Caroline ou le Départ pour les îles, Gallimard, (Prix Femina)
 1939: Arianwen, short story in the Revue des deux Mondes
 1940: Agnès ou le Rivage de Bohème, Gallimard, .
 1946: Ophélia ou l'Anglaise de la colline (posthumous).

See also

External links 
 Félix de Chazournes on Gallimard

20th-century French non-fiction writers
20th-century French male writers
Prix Femina winners
Writers from Lyon
1887 births
1940 deaths
French military personnel of World War I